The 1894 Cornell Big Red football team was an American football team that represented Cornell University during the 1894 college football season.  In their first season under head coach Marshall Newell, the Big Red compiled a 6–4–1 record and outscored all opponents by a combined total of 178 to 58. Pop Warner was the team's captain.

Schedule

Game summaries

Michigan
On November 24, Cornell lost to Michigan, 12–4. The result was the first victory by a Michigan football team against one of the elite Eastern football teams, and "the Michigan men went wild" as blue and yellow were "all the colors that could be seen." The Detroit Free Press filled its front page with a lengthy account of the game under the headline, "GLORIOUS!", and proclaimed the start of "halcyon days at the university" and opined that "the day of logy teams, slow signalling and dumb playing at the university are but pages in history now."  The Free Press predicted that the victory would mark a turning point in the popularity of football in the West, such that "it will become the only acknowledged game of the fall, and its devotees will outnumber those of any other game." The University of Michigan yearbook, The Palladium, wrote: "The enthusiasm of that day at Detroit transformed our foot ball team from the practically 'backwoods' organization that they were to skillful, scientific players of the great American game of foot ball.  Let the good work go on."

References

Cornell
Cornell Big Red football seasons
Cornell Big Red football